Mountfield Halt (TQ 746 197 ) was situated on the Hastings Line between Robertsbridge and Battle. It opened in 1923 and was closed on 6 October 1969. Both platforms were built of sleepers. The station stood just east of Battle Road (A2100) level crossing.

There are no remains of the halt today.

References

Sources
 

Disused railway stations in East Sussex
Former Southern Railway (UK) stations
Railway stations in Great Britain opened in 1923
Railway stations in Great Britain closed in 1969
Beeching closures in England
Rother District